HSwMS Wrangel (25), formerly (9), was a destroyer in the Swedish Navy, built at Lindholm Shipyard in Gothenburg, and was launched on 24 September 1917 as the first of two destroyers of the Wrangel class. Wrangel was a sister ship to HSwMS Wachtmeister. The ship class were among the most modern destroyers in the world just after the end of World War I. At the outbreak of World War II in 1939 she was stationed as part of the Gothenburg Squadron. Wrangel was decommissioned in 1947 and was subsequently used as a pilot and target vessel and sunk on Hårsfjärden in 1960. The ship was named after admiral Carl Gustaf Wrangel.

Design

Wrangels hull was made of nitrated steel. Like former Swedish destroyers, the ship had no proper superstructure on the bow, but had only a protective skirt wall for the command bridge, though there was a small superstructure on the stern. The propulsion machinery consisted of four steam boilers which delivered steam to two steam turbines. The machine generated an output of 11,500 horsepower, giving a maximum speed of 34 knots. Each boiler had a separate funnel, which led to the common four stack arrangement of the time. The two steam turbines were of a new type with reduction gears, which meant that the turbine speed could be shifted down to lower the propeller speed, giving the machinery a better efficiency.

On delivery, the ship's main artillery consisted of two 7.5 cm guns m/12 that were placed on the front and rear deck. The close-range protection consisted of two 6.5 mm machine guns m/14 that were placed on either side of the command bridge. The torpedo armament consisted of six 45.7 cm torpedo tubes m/14. Four of these stood as in the previous class in two double stands on the main deck. What was new was that two more were placed behind gaps in the front of the hull.

History
Wrangel was built at Lindholm's Gothenburg shipyard and was launched on 24 September 1917. After fitting out and trials she was delivered to the Swedish Navy on 4 May 1918.

In 1923, Crown Prince Gustav Adolf would be engaged to Louise Mountbatten with the engagement taking place in England. On 28 June, Wrangel went from Karlskrona together with her sister ship Wachtmeister and all three ships in the Sverige class. On July 2 they went to Sheerness, England where the couple visited the ships. A couple of days later, the journey proceeded to Rosyth, Scotland, where they visited the English Atlantic fleet before going back to Sweden.

In the mid-1920s, the ship's boilers, which were initially coal-fired, were converted to oil-fired.

World War II 
In 1939, the ship was redeployed, when the forward two torpedo tubes were removed and a 25 mm anti-aircraft automatic gun was added. Furthermore, the two machine guns were replaced with an 8 mm anti-aircraft machine gun m/36 that was mounted on the aft bridge and two depth charge positions with 16 depth charges m/24. During the beginning of World War II, Wrangel together with her sister ship was part of the Gothenburg Squadron. In the winter of 1940-1941 the ship would receive new boilers, but by late autumn 1943 she was put into material reserve in Stockholm.

Fate
After Wrangel was placed in reserve, she never would be reactivated and was released from service on 13 June 1947. Thereafter she was used as a pilot and target vessel and sank in Hårsfjärden in 1960.

References

Notes

Print

Wrangel-class destroyers
Ships built in Gothenburg
Ships sunk as targets
1917 ships
Shipwrecks of Sweden
Shipwrecks in the Baltic Sea